Ermengarde de Beaumont (c. 1170 – 11 February 1233/1234) was Queen of Scotland as the wife of King William I. She is reported to have exerted influence over the affairs of state as queen, though the information of her is lacking in detail. Her paternal grandmother is Constance FitzRoy, illegitimate daughter of Henry I of England.

Life

She married King William I of Scotland at the royal chapel at Woodstock Palace near Oxford in England on 5 September 1186 by Baldwin, Archbishop of Canterbury. The marriage was arranged by King Henry II of England, who was at the time the acknowledged overlord of Scotland: William considered her status beneath him, but agreed after Henry offered to pay for the entire wedding, land valued at 100 merks and 40 knight's fees, and to return the castles that he had forfeited, one of them being Edinburgh.

The chronicler Walter Bower described Ermengarde as 'an extraordinary woman, gifted with a charming and witty eloquence'. Though William had many lovers before his marriage, the aging monarch was reportedly never unfaithful to her after their wedding. The relatives of Ermengarde benefited from her status as queen. She is recorded to have presided with the Bishop of St. Andrews over a complex court case. In 1207, there was a complaint by a canon that a royal chaplain obtained the bishopric of Glasgow by bribing the King and the Queen. Queen Ermengarde is credited with mediating a renegotiation of the 1209 treaty, probably due to her husband's incapacity. Due to the illness of William, Ermengarde took over some of his duties during his later years, and there is evidence that she wielded considerable influence in public affairs.  In 1212, she accompanied William with their children to King John of England to secure the succession of their son Alexander. Ermengarde was described as distraught and lethargic over her husband's death in 1214.

As queen dowager, she devoted her time to the foundation of a Cistercian abbey at Balmerino in Fife. It was completed in 1229, and she often visited it as a guest with her son Alexander. She stayed at the abbey many times.

Children

Margaret of Scotland (1193–1259). Married Hubert de Burgh, 1st Earl of Kent.
Isabella of Scotland (1195–1253). Married Roger Bigod, 4th Earl of Norfolk.
Alexander II of Scotland (1198–1249).
Marjorie of Scotland (1200–1244). Married Gilbert Marshal, 4th Earl of Pembroke.
 
She died on 12 February 1233/1234, and was buried at St Edward of Balmerino Abbey, Fife.

References

Alison Weir, Britain's Royal Families: The Complete Genealogy
 "The Kings and Queens of Scotland" edited by Richard Oram
 "Scottish Queens 1034-1714" by Rosalind K. Marshall
 "British Kings and Queens" by Mike Ashley

External links
"Ermengarde de Beaumont" at The Peerage

Scottish royal consorts
House of Dunkeld
1170s births
1230s deaths
12th-century Scottish women
13th-century Scottish women
12th-century Scottish people
13th-century Scottish people
12th-century French women
13th-century French women
12th-century French people
13th-century French people
Queen mothers